Mauston is a city in and the county seat of Juneau County, Wisconsin, United States. The population was 4,347 as of the 2020 census. It is approximately 70 miles northwest from the state capital, Madison.

History
Mauston was founded by Milton M. Maughs. The town was originally named Maughs Town, after him.  The town's beginning was based on the lumber industry of early Wisconsin. The history of Mauston is currently preserved in the Boorman House on Union Street.

Geography
Mauston is located at  (43.798, -90.077). It is in the Central Standard time zone. Elevation is 883 feet.

Transportation 
Mauston is served by the Mauston-New Lisbon Union Airport (82C). This general-aviation airport is jointly owned with New Lisbon. The closest airports with commercial service are Dane County Regional Airport and La Crosse Regional Airport, about one hour in either direction via Interstate 90.

I-90 and Interstate 94 run concurrently, with an interchange located at Wisconsin Highway 82. U.S. Route 12 and Wisconsin Highway 16 run concurrently northwest/southeast through downtown as a two-lane road almost parallel to the interstates. Wisconsin Highway 58 runs north/south through town and crosses over I-90/I-94 without an exit. WIS-82 runs east/west through town with a brief concurrency with WIS-58, then continues east to the interchange.

Demographics

2020 census
As of the census of 2020, the population was 4,347. Ethnically, the population was 3.6% Hispanic or Latino of any race. When grouping both Hispanic and non-Hispanic people together by race, the city was 89.5% White, 2.7% Black or African American, 1.2% Native American, 0.8% Asian, 1.4% from other races, and 4.5% from two or more races. 

The 2020 census population of the city included 378 people incarcerated in adult correctional facilities.

According  to the American Community Survey estimates for 2016-2020, the median income for a household in the city was $49,730, and the median income for a family was $63,839. Male full-time workers had a median income of $40,547 versus $35,809 for female workers. The per capita income for the city was $26,214. About 7.6% of families and 18.7% of the population were below the poverty line, including 14.5% of those under age 18 and 22.0% of those age 65 or over. Of the population age 25 and over, 89.2% were high school graduates or higher and 15.1% had a bachelor's degree or higher.

2010 census
As of the census of 2010, there were 4,423 people, 1,779 households, and 985 families living in the city. The racial makeup of the city was 92.8% White, 2.6% African American, 1.2% Native American, 0.7% Asian, 0.7% from other races, and 2.0% from two or more races. Hispanic or Latino people of any race were 3.5% of the population.

There were 1,779 households, of which 29.3% had children under the age of 18 living with them, 35.9% were married couples living together, 13.7% had a female householder with no husband present, 5.8% had a male householder with no wife present, and 44.6% were non-families. 37.3% of all households were made up of individuals, and 17.4% had someone living alone who was 65 years of age or older. The average household size was 2.25 and the average family size was 2.94.

The median age in the city was 39.3 years. 22.3% of residents were under the age of 18; 8.7% were between the ages of 18 and 24; 26.6% were from 25 to 44; 25.4% were from 45 to 64; and 17.1% were 65 years of age or older. The gender makeup of the city was 50.1% male and 49.9% female.

2000 census
As of the census of 2000, there were 3,740 people, 1,585 households, and 963 families living in the city. The population density was 1,022.6 people per square mile (394.5/km2). There were 1,729 housing units at an average density of 472.8 per square mile (182.4/km2). The racial makeup of the city was 96.28% White, 0.67% African American, 0.35% Native American, 1.18% Asian, 0.48% from other races, and 1.04% from two or more races. Hispanic or Latino people of any race were 2.11% of the population.

There were 1,585 households, out of which 29.1% had children under the age of 18 living with them, 45.0% were married couples living together, 11.8% had a female householder with no husband present, and 39.2% were non-families. 33.5% of all households were made up of individuals, and 18.7% had someone living alone who was 65 years of age or older. The average household size was 2.28 and the average family size was 2.89.

In the city, the population was spread out, with 24.2% under the age of 18, 8.6% from 18 to 24, 27.1% from 25 to 44, 19.2% from 45 to 64, and 20.9% who were 65 years of age or older. The median age was 38 years. For every 100 females, there were 88.1 males. For every 100 females age 18 and over, there were 81.4 males.

Education
The city and surrounding area are served by the Mauston Area School District, which provides kindergarten through senior high education. District schools include West Side Elementary (grades 4K-2), Grayside Elementary (grades 3–5), Olson Middle School (which is housed in the former high school and serves grades 6, 7, and 8), and Mauston High School, which opened its doors in 2001. Lyndon Station Elementary School, which houses grades K-5, is located in nearby Lyndon Station.

A pre-K through 8th grade Catholic parochial school has been operated by St. Patrick Parish since 1895. The parish also operated St. Patrick High School from 1933 to 1951, and Madonna High School from 1951 to 1966. This school holds about 200 students from all counties of Southern Wisconsin.

Mauston is also home to a campus of Western Technical College.

Media
WRJC-FM, radio
Juneau County Star-Times, newspaper

Notable people

 John T. Benson, Superintendent of Public Instruction of Wisconsin
 Kelly Bires, NASCAR driver, also won two state wrestling championships in Wisconsin
 Thomas John Curran, United States Federal Court judge
 Kenneth Philip Grubb. United States Federal Court judge
 Frank H. Hanson, Wisconsin State Senator and Representative
 Leo Kieffer, Maine State Senator
 Bill Lobenstein, NFL player
 Orland Steen Loomis, one-time Governor-elect of Wisconsin
 John Patterson, Medal of Honor recipient
 Jessica Powers, Roman Catholic nun and writer
 Clinton G. Price, Wisconsin State Representative and lawyer
 Edwin M. Truell, Medal of Honor recipient

References

External links

 City of Mauston
Greater Mauston Tourism website
 Sanborn fire insurance maps: 1894 1901 1909

Cities in Wisconsin
Cities in Juneau County, Wisconsin
County seats in Wisconsin